Peter Griffiths (1928–2013) was a British politician.

Peter Griffiths may also refer to:

Peter Griffiths (footballer, born 1862) (1862–?), Welsh footballer
Peter Griffiths (footballer, born 1957), English footballer
Peter Griffiths (footballer, born 1980), English footballer
Peter Griffiths (sport shooter) (1892–?), British sport shooter
Peter Griffiths, murderer of June Anne Devaney

See also
Peter Griffin (disambiguation)